, is a Japanese manga artist. At the age of 15, she debuted with the short comic Ai no Ai Shirushi in 2000 and has been since known for her works Stardust Wink and Tsubasa to Hotaru.

Career

Haruta published her first story at the age of 15 with Ai no Ai Shirushi, which was first published in the December 2000 issue of Ribon Original, making her one of the youngest artists to professionally debut as a manga artists.

Works

Series

Short stories

Anthologies

Non-anthology stories

Illustration credits

References

Manga artists from Niigata Prefecture
1985 births
Living people
Women manga artists